Pouilly-Fumé is an appellation d'origine contrôlée (AOC) for the dry sauvignon blanc white wine produced around Pouilly-sur-Loire, in the Nièvre département.  Another white wine produced in the same area but with a different grape variety is called Pouilly-sur-Loire.

Etymology 
Pouilly-Fumé is made purely from sauvignon blanc, a type of vine whose clusters are formed of small ovoid grapes, pressed against each other and resembling small bird eggs.  At maturity, these grapes are coated with a grey bloom, the color of smoke—which explains why Pouilly winegrowers talk of "white smoke" to describe the type of vine or the wines made from it. "Fumé" also refers to the smoky bouquet (the renowned "gun flint aroma"), bestowed by the terroir vineyards of Pouilly-sur-Loire.

History

Antiquity 
The vineyards of Pouilly-Fumé date back to the fifth century. The area was a Gallo-Roman estate dating back to the early days of the Roman Empire. The name derives from the Latin  (Pauliacum on the River Loire), reflecting the Roman road which passed through this locality.

Middle Ages 
Benedictine monks commenced development of Pouilly-Fumé in the Middle Ages.  Sacramental wine is traditionally white, less prone to staining, and the Benedictines developed the vineyards without seeking profitability.  The fiefdom and vineyards of Pouilly were transferred to the Benedictines of La Charité-sur-Loire for the sum of "3100 sous and a silver mark" towards the end of the eleventh century. A plot of about  overlooking the River Loire has retained the appellation Loge aux Moines (Monks’ Lodge), in memory of that era.  The repurchase of Boisgibault lands in 1383 by Jean III de Sancerre demonstrates the proximity that has always existed between this vineyard and that of Sancerre, and their respective white wine production.

Modern period 
Despite floods and low water, transport of Pouilly wines via the Loire was efficient and fast, due to the location of the vineyard.  This wine was always exported by water navigation, especially after the opening of the Canal de Briare in 1642. After the French Revolution of 1789, peasants were able to become owners of land and vineyards formerly possessions of the nobility and clergy.  

At the end of the nineteenth century, growers were faced with mildew and phylloxera.  The vineyard was devastated and many cultivators had to redeploy.  After many unsuccessful attempts at treatment, the vines were uprooted in the early twentieth century and only part of the vineyard was replanted after grafting onto American rootstock.

Contemporary period 
Pouilly-Fumé has been an Appellation d'origine contrôlée (AOC) since 1937.   Today a large part of the production is sold abroad, especially to Great Britain.

Location 
The following vineyard communes are to be found in the Nièvre, to the east of the Loire: Pouilly-sur-Loire, Saint-Andelain, Tracy-sur-Loire (village Boisgibault), Saint-Laurent-l'Abbaye, Mesves-sur-Loire, Saint-Martin-sur-Nohain, Garchy.

Orography 
The terrain is slightly undulating because of the Loire which has created a valley;  Sancerre is on a promontory to the other side of the river.

Geology 
The soil consists of three major types: Kimmeridgian marl, hard limestone and flint clay.

Climate 
The climate is temperate with a slight tendency to continental.

Vineyard 

This varietal Sauvignon is similar to those of the vineyards of Sancerre. It should not be confused with Pouilly-Fuissé, a chardonnay wine from the south of Burgundy (Mâcon).

References

Further reading 
 Mastrojanni Michel: Les Vins de France (green guide solar). Solar Editions, Paris 1992 - 1994 - 1998

External links
 Pouilly-Fumé AOC. official site  
 2 Rives pour vous servir.com: Article on the "Syndicat Viticole de l'Aire AOC de Pouilly", (in English)

Loire AOCs